Masihullah Barakzai (born December 6, 1990) is an Afghan footballer who currently plays for Afghan Premier F.C from U.S. He also played for Saremyesht F.C at Kabul Premier League Afghanistan from 2009 to 2012. He played for U-21 national team as a defensive midfielder for South Asian Games at Bangladesh in 2010 with five official caps against India, Sri Lanka, Pakistan, Maldives and Bangladesh and then selected for senior Afghanistan national football team. He has 7 official caps, against Tajikistan, Bhutan and Nepal, Palestine, India and one unofficial, as the national team played against Tajikistan U-23 team in a second match. He wears number 11 and his main positions on the field is defensive/offensive midfielder, right and left winger.

External links
 

Afghan men's footballers
Living people
1990 births
Footballers from Kabul
Association football midfielders
Afghanistan international footballers